Robert Lewis Everist (born November 1952) is an English businessman. He was born in Enfield Town in the London conurbation. An entrepreneur, he has set up childcare centres, commercial office space, small schools and plastic manufacturing businesses.

Career

Jointly with second wife, Susan Mills, he has restored Lound Hall, Bothamsall, Nottinghamshire, bought in 2009. He and Mills are chief shareholders of: 
The Childcare Eastmidlands (a group)
Cherubs Day Nurseries (a group)
Plastimet, a fabrication manufacturer based in Derby
Glosscalm Properties, a commercial property company

Several assets are lawfully held via Glosscalm Group, a Jersey-based company (see real estate investment trust).

Criticism
In 2009, on its centenary year, the couple closed the Attenborough School, local to them, which was bought by their childcare company in 2005 for GBP 1.2m. Negative media coverage claimed their holding company had pressured employees of the subsidiary into handing in notice a week before its closing.

Personal life

Everist has two children from his first marriage, and three stepchildren. He is also an avid art collector and golfer. In October 2017, Everist's stepson, Charlie Mills joined the cast of Made in Chelsea, a television show on E4 which follows the lives of affluent young people living in West London.

Golf
Everist is a keen golfer, and has a handicap of 12. Everist is a member at Notts Golf Club, Hollinwell.

References

British corporate directors
1952 births
Living people
People from Enfield, London
English Jews
English company founders
People from Bassetlaw District